De Martin may refer to:

 Massimo De Martin, an Italian professional footballer
 190310 De Martin, an asteroid